N5 or N-5 may refer to:

Science and technology 
 N5, the minimal non-modular and non-distributive lattice in mathematical order theory
N5, abbreviation for the 5 nanometer semiconductor technology process node

Roads

Other uses
 N°5, a shortening for Number Five, see Number Five (disambiguation)
 LNER Class N5, a class of British steam locomotives 
 London Buses route N5
 Nexus 5, an Android smartphone
 N5, a postcode district in the N postcode area, North London, England
 SP&S Class N-5, a steam locomotives class, used by the Spokane, Portland and Seattle Railway
 USS N-5 (SS-57), a 1917 N-class coastal defense submarine of the United States Navy
 The first level in the Japanese-Language Proficiency Test
 "N5" (song), by Lali, 2022

See also
N05 (disambiguation)
Pentazenium (N5+), a pentanitrogen cation in chemistry
pentazolium cation (N5+), a cation that is made up of five nitrogen atoms, in chemistry.
pentazolate anion (N5−), an anion that is made up of five nitrogen atoms, in chemistry
 5N (disambiguation).